John William Cozens (born 14 May 1946) is an English former professional footballer who played in the Football League as a forward for Notts County, Peterborough United and Cambridge United. He began his career in non-league football with Tonbridge, was a prolific goalscorer for three seasons for Hayes, and signed professional forms with Hillingdon Borough in 1968, before moving into league football. Cozens went on to coach at Cambridge United, becoming assistant manager and on occasions caretaker manager, and managed non-league club King's Lynn for six months in the 1988–99 season.

References

1946 births
Living people
Footballers from Hammersmith
English footballers
Association football forwards
Tonbridge Angels F.C. players
Hayes F.C. players
Notts County F.C. players
Peterborough United F.C. players
Cambridge United F.C. players
English football managers
Cambridge United F.C. managers
King's Lynn F.C. managers
Hillingdon Borough F.C. players
Cambridge United F.C. non-playing staff